The Guadalajara Mexico Temple is the 105th operating temple of the Church of Jesus Christ of Latter-day Saints (LDS Church).

The Guadalajara Mexico Temple is one of thirteen operating temples in Mexico.

History
Mexico's first temple, located in Mexico City, was dedicated in 1983. Since that time, the LDS Church has grown considerably in Mexico. The Guadalajara Temple, located in the conurbated municipality of Zapopan, serves more than 60,000 members in the country's second largest city, the state of Jalisco, and other parts of western Mexico.

About 6,500 members attended the dedication of the Guadalajara temple on 29 April 2001. LDS Church president Gordon B. Hinckley presided and gave the dedicatory prayer.

In 2020, the Guadalajara Mexico Temple was closed in response to the coronavirus pandemic.

See also

 Comparison of temples of The Church of Jesus Christ of Latter-day Saints
 List of temples of The Church of Jesus Christ of Latter-day Saints
 List of temples of The Church of Jesus Christ of Latter-day Saints by geographic region
 Temple architecture (Latter-day Saints)
 The Church of Jesus Christ of Latter-day Saints in Mexico

References

External links
 
Guadalajara Mexico Temple Official site
Guadalajara Mexico Temple at ChurchofJesusChristTemples.org

21st-century Latter Day Saint temples
Buildings and structures in Jalisco
Temples (LDS Church) completed in 2001
Temples (LDS Church) in Mexico
2001 establishments in Mexico